Literary movements are a way to divide literature into categories of similar philosophical, topical, or aesthetic features, as opposed to divisions by genre or period. Like other categorizations, literary movements provide language for comparing and discussing literary works. These terms are helpful for curricula or anthologies.

Some of these movements (such as Dada and Beat) were defined by the members themselves, while other terms (for example, the metaphysical poets) emerged decades or centuries after the periods in question. Further, some movements are well defined and distinct, while others, like expressionism, are nebulous and overlap with other definitions. Because of these differences, literary movements are often a point of contention between scholars.

List
This is a list of modern literary movements: that is, movements after the Renaissance. Ordering is approximate, as there is considerable overlap.

References

Movements